The Qilian Mountains Conifer Forests ecoregion (WWF ID: PA0517) is an ecoregion that consists of a series of isolated conifer forests on the northern slopes of the Qilian Mountain Range, on the northeast edge of the Tibetan Plateau in central China.

Location and description 
The scattered patches of this ecoregion are thin ridges of forest between the Gobi Desert to the north, and the dry and high Tibetan Plateau to the south. The surrounding areas are alpine meadows and scrub.  The fragmented forests are found in isolated segments in the eastern Qilian Mountains, Daban Shan, the Amne Machin range, and Dié Shan.  These segments are located in Qinghai and Gansu provinces.

Climate 
Because of its high elevation and mid-continental location, the ecoregion's climate is Subarctic climate, dry winter (Köppen climate classification Subarctic climate (Dwc)). This climate is characterized by mild summers (only 1–3 months above ) and cold winters having monthly precipitation less than one-tenth of the wettest summer month.

Flora and fauna 
The dominant trees in the ecoregion are the Qilian spruce (Picea crassifolia) and the Przewalski's juniper (Juniperus przewalskii).  There are stands of short-stature bamboo in the understory.   The relative isolation of the forests suggests that they may serve as habitat for a number of rare species of mammals, but the area is little studied and the presence of vulnerable species is unclear.

References 

Ecoregions of China
Forests of China
Temperate coniferous forests
Montane forests